The Wallace House is a Georgian style historic house, which served as the headquarters of General George Washington during the second Middlebrook encampment (1778–79), located at 38 Washington Place, Somerville, Somerset County, New Jersey, United States. It was added to the National Register of Historic Places on December 2, 1970.

History
In 1775 and 1776, Wallace bought  more land, and in 1776 built an eight-room Georgian mansion next to the farmhouse. 
Wallace named the estate "Hope Farm," and planned to retire there.

The Continental Army camped in the Watchung Mountains at Middlebrook,  from Hope Farm during the winter of 1778–79. 
The Wallace House became George Washington's headquarters, though he only stayed there for 11 days before leaving to attend the Continental Congress in Philadelphia for 6 weeks. Washington returned in February 1779 bringing his wife Martha. The Washingtons were given use of half the house. He then used the house to host foreign dignitaries and official dinners, and to plan military strategy.
In particular, he planned the 1779 campaign against the Iroquois League known as the Sullivan Expedition. Guests at the parties included  Benedict Arnold, Nathanael Greene, Alexander Hamilton, Henry Knox, and Baron Steuben.

Washington left on June 3, 1779, and paid Wallace $1,000. 
The Wallace family and their slaves then returned to their normal lives in the house.

John Wallace, his wife, and his mother-in-law all died in 1783–84, and his youngest son William inherited Hope Farm. 
William lived there until he died at age 33 in 1796, leaving three orphan children.
William's brother Joshua took care of the children and sold Hope Farm to Dickinson Miller in 1801.

The Revolutionary Memorial Society bought the house in 1896, and gave it to the State of New Jersey in 1947.

See also

 List of museums in New Jersey
 List of Washington's Headquarters during the Revolutionary War
Other houses used as headquarters during the second Middlebrook encampment (1778–79):
 Van Veghten House – General Nathanael Greene
 Van Horne House – General William Alexander, Lord Stirling
 Staats House – General Friedrich Wilhelm von Steuben
 Jacobus Vanderveer House – General Henry Knox

References

External links
 The Wallace House and Old Dutch Parsonage Association – official website
Virtual Tour Wallace House and Old Dutch Parsonage, New Jersey Division of Parks and Forestry.  Retrieved February 3, 2012.

Houses completed in 1776
Georgian architecture in New Jersey
Houses on the National Register of Historic Places in New Jersey
Museums in Somerset County, New Jersey
Historic house museums in New Jersey
Houses in Somerset County, New Jersey
National Register of Historic Places in Somerset County, New Jersey
New Jersey Register of Historic Places
Somerville, New Jersey
Historic American Buildings Survey in New Jersey
American Revolution on the National Register of Historic Places
New Jersey in the American Revolution